The ellipsis  (also known informally as dot dot dot) is a series of dots that indicates an intentional omission of a word, sentence, or whole section from a text without altering its original meaning. The plural is ellipses.

Opinions differ as to how to render ellipses in printed material. According to The Chicago Manual of Style, it should consist of three periods, each separated from its neighbor by a non-breaking space: . According to the AP Stylebook, the periods should be rendered with no space between them: . A third option is to use the Unicode character U+2026  .

Background
The ellipsis is also called a suspension point, points of ellipsis, periods of ellipsis, or (colloquially) "dot-dot-dot". Depending on their context and placement in a sentence, ellipses can indicate an unfinished thought, a leading statement, a slight pause, an echoing voice, or a nervous or awkward silence. Aposiopesis is the use of an ellipsis to trail off into silence—for example: "But I thought he was..." When placed at the end of a sentence, an ellipsis may be used to suggest melancholy or longing.

The most common forms of an ellipsis include a row of three periods or full points  or a precomposed triple-dot glyph, the horizontal ellipsis . Style guides often have their own rules governing the use of ellipses. For example, The Chicago Manual of Style (Chicago style) recommends that an ellipsis be formed by typing three periods, each with a space on both sides , while the Associated Press Stylebook (AP style) puts the dots together, but retains a space before and after the group, thus: . Whether an ellipsis at the end of a sentence needs a fourth dot to finish the sentence is a matter of debate; Chicago advises it, as does the Publication Manual of the American Psychological Association (APA style), while some other style guides do not; the Merriam-Webster Dictionary and related works treat this style as optional, saying that it "may" be used. 

When text is omitted following a sentence, a normal full stop (period) terminates the sentence, and then a separate three-dot ellipsis is commonly used to indicate one or more subsequent omitted sentences before continuing a longer quotation. Business Insider magazine suggests this style and it is also used in many academic journals. The Associated Press Stylebook favors this approach.

In writing
In her book on the ellipsis, Ellipsis in English Literature: Signs of Omission, Anne Toner suggests that the first use of the punctuation in the English language dates to a 1588 translation of Terence's Andria, by Maurice Kyffin. In this case, however, the ellipsis consists not of dots but of short dashes. "Subpuncting" of medieval manuscripts also denotes omitted meaning and may be related.

Occasionally, it would be used in pulp fiction and other works of early 20th-century fiction to denote expletives that would otherwise have been censored.

An ellipsis may also imply an unstated alternative indicated by context. For example, "I never drink wine ..." implies that the speaker does drink something elsesuch as vodka.

In reported speech, the ellipsis can be used to represent an intentional silence.

In poetry, an ellipsis is used as a thought-pause or line break at the caesura or this is used to highlight sarcasm or make the reader think about the last points in the poem.

In news reporting, often put inside square brackets, it is used to indicate that a quotation has been condensed for space, brevity or relevance, as in "The President said that [...] he would not be satisfied", where the exact quotation was "The President said that, for as long as this situation continued, he would not be satisfied".

Herb Caen, Pulitzer-prize-winning columnist for the San Francisco Chronicle, became famous for his "three-dot journalism".

In different languages

In English

American English
The Chicago Manual of Style suggests the use of an ellipsis for any omitted word, phrase, line, or paragraph from within but not at the end of a quoted passage. There are two commonly used methods of using ellipses: one uses three dots for any omission, while the second one makes a distinction between omissions within a sentence (using three dots: . . .) and omissions between sentences (using a period and a space followed by three dots: . ...). The Chicago Style Q&A recommends that writers avoid using the precomposed  (U+2026) character in manuscripts and to place three periods plus two nonbreaking spaces (. . .) instead, leaving the editor, publisher, or typographer to replace them later. 

The Modern Language Association (MLA) used to indicate that an ellipsis must include spaces before and after each dot in all uses. If an ellipsis is meant to represent an omission, square brackets must surround the ellipsis to make it clear that there was no pause in the original quote: . Currently, the MLA has removed the requirement of brackets in its style handbooks. However, some maintain that the use of brackets is still correct because it clears confusion.

The MLA now indicates that a three-dot, spaced ellipsis  should be used for removing material from within one sentence within a quote. When crossing sentences (when the omitted text contains a period, so that omitting the end of a sentence counts), a four-dot, spaced (except for before the first dot) ellipsis  should be used. When ellipsis points are used in the original text, ellipsis points that are not in the original text should be distinguished by enclosing them in square brackets (e.g. ).

According to the Associated Press, the ellipsis should be used to condense quotations. It is less commonly used to indicate a pause in speech or an unfinished thought or to separate items in material such as show business gossip. The stylebook indicates that if the shortened sentence before the mark can stand as a sentence, it should do so, with an ellipsis placed after the period or other ending punctuation. When material is omitted at the end of a paragraph and also immediately following it, an ellipsis goes both at the end of that paragraph and at the beginning of the next, according to this style.

According to Robert Bringhurst's Elements of Typographic Style, the details of typesetting ellipses depend on the character and size of the font being set and the typographer's preference. Bringhurst writes that a full space between each dot is "another Victorian eccentricity. In most contexts, the Chicago ellipsis is much too wide"—he recommends using flush dots (with a normal word space before and after), or thin-spaced dots (up to one-fifth of an em), or the prefabricated ellipsis character . Bringhurst suggests that normally an ellipsis should be spaced fore-and-aft to separate it from the text, but when it combines with other punctuation, the leading space disappears and the other punctuation follows. This is the usual practice in typesetting. He provides the following examples:

In legal writing in the United States, Rule 5.3 in the Bluebook citation guide governs the use of ellipses and requires a space before the first dot and between the two subsequent dots. If an ellipsis ends the sentence, then there are three dots, each separated by a space, followed by the final punctuation (e.g. ).

British English
The Oxford Style Guide recommends setting the ellipsis as a single character  or as a series of three (narrow) spaced dots surrounded by spaces, thus: . If there is an ellipsis at the end of an incomplete sentence, the final full stop is omitted. However, it is retained if the following ellipsis represents an omission between two complete sentences.

The … fox jumps …
The quick brown fox jumps over the lazy dog. … And if they have not died, they are still alive today.
It is not cold … it is freezing cold.

Contrary to The Oxford Style Guide, the University of Oxford Style Guide demands an ellipsis not to be surrounded by spaces, except when it stands for a pause; then, a space has to be set after the ellipsis (but not before). An ellipsis is never preceded or followed by a full stop.

The...fox jumps...
The quick brown fox jumps over the lazy dog...And if they have not died, they are still alive today.
It is not cold... it is freezing cold.

In Polish
When applied in Polish syntax, the ellipsis is called , literally 'multidot'. When an ellipsis replaces a fragment omitted from a quotation, the ellipsis is enclosed in parentheses or square brackets. An unbracketed ellipsis indicates an interruption or pause in speech. The syntactic rules for ellipses are standardized by the 1983 Polska Norma document PN-83/P-55366,  (Rules for Setting Texts in Polish).

In Russian
The combination "ellipsis+period" is replaced by the ellipsis. The combinations "ellipsis+exclamation mark" and "ellipsis+question mark" are written in this way: !.. ?..

In Japanese
The most common character corresponding to an ellipsis is called 3-ten rīdā ("3-dot leaders"). 2-ten rīdā exists as a character, but it is used less commonly. In writing, the ellipsis consists usually of six dots (two 3-ten rīdā characters). Three dots (one 3-ten rīdā character) may be used where space is limited, such as in a header. However, variations in the number of dots exist. In horizontally written text the dots are commonly vertically centered within the text height (between the baseline and the ascent line), as in the standard Japanese Windows fonts; in vertically written text the dots are always centered horizontally. As the Japanese word for dot is pronounced "", the dots are colloquially called "" (akin to the English "dot dot dot").

In text in Japanese media, such as in manga or video games, ellipses are much more frequent than in English, and are often changed to another punctuation sign in translation. The ellipsis by itself represents speechlessness, or a "pregnant pause". Depending on the context, this could be anything from an admission of guilt to an expression of being dumbfounded at another person's words or actions. As a device, the ten-ten-ten is intended to focus the reader on a character while allowing the character to not speak any dialogue. This conveys to the reader a focus of the narrative "camera" on the silent subject, implying an expectation of some motion or action. It is not unheard of to see inanimate objects "speaking" the ellipsis.

In Chinese
In Chinese, the ellipsis is six dots (in two groups of three dots, occupying the same horizontal or vertical space as two characters). In horizontally written text the dots are commonly vertically centered within the text height (between the baseline and the ascent line, i.e. ); in vertically written text the dots are always centered horizontally (i.e. ).

In Spanish
In Spanish, the ellipsis is commonly used as a substitute of et cetera at the end of unfinished lists. So it means "and so forth" or "and other things".

Other use is the suspension of a part of a text, or a paragraph, or a phrase or a part of a word because it is obvious, or unnecessary, or implied. For instance, sometimes the ellipsis is used to avoid the complete use of expletives.

When the ellipsis is placed alone into a parenthesis (...) or—less often—between brackets [...], which is what happens usually within a text transcription, it means the original text had more contents on the same position but are not useful to our target in the transcription. When the suppressed text is at the beginning or at the end of a text, the ellipsis does not need to be placed in a parenthesis.

The number of dots is three and only three.

In French
In French, the ellipsis is commonly used at the end of lists to represent . In French typography, the ellipsis is written immediately after the preceding word, but has a space after it, for example: . If, exceptionally, it begins a sentence, there is a space before and after, for example: . However, any omitted word, phrase or line at the end of a quoted passage would be indicated as follows: [...] (space before and after the square brackets but not inside), for example: .

In German
In German, the ellipsis in general is surrounded by spaces, if it stands for one or more omitted words. On the other side there is no space between a letter or (part of) a word and an ellipsis, if it stands for one or more omitted letters, that should stick to the written letter or letters.

Example for both cases, using German style: The first el...is stands for omitted letters, the second ... for an omitted word.

If the ellipsis is at the end of a sentence, the final full stop is omitted.

Example: I think that ...

In Italian 
The  suggests the use of an ellipsis to indicate a pause longer than a period and, when placed between brackets, the omission of letters, words or phrases.

Usage in computer system menus

In computer menu functions or buttons, an ellipsis means that upon selection more options (sometimes in the form of a dialog box) will be displayed, where the user can or must make a choice. If the ellipsis is absent, the function is immediately executed upon selection.

For example, the menu item "Save" indicates that the file will be overwritten without further input, whereas "Save as..." indicates that a dialog follows where the user can, for example, select another location, file name, or format.

Ellipses are also used as a separate button (particularly considering the limited screen area of mobile apps) to represent partially or completely hidden options. This usage may alternatively be described as a "More button" (see also hamburger button signifying completely hidden options).

In mobile, web, and general application design, the vertical ellipsis, is sometimes used as an interface element, where it is sometimes called a kebab icon. The element typically indicates that a navigation menu can be accessed when the element is activated, and is a smaller version of the hamburger icon (≡) which is a stylized rendering of a menu.

In mathematical notation
An ellipsis is also often used in mathematics to mean "and so forth". In a list, between commas, or following a comma, a normal ellipsis is used, as in:

 

or to mean an infinite list, as:

 

To indicate the omission of values in a repeated operation, an ellipsis raised to the center of the line is used between two operation symbols or following the last operation symbol, as in:

 

Sometimes, e.g. in Russian mathematical texts, normal, non-raised, ellipses are used even in repeated summations.

The latter formula means the sum of all natural numbers from 1 to 100. However, it is not a formally defined mathematical symbol. Repeated summations or products may similarly be denoted using capital sigma and capital pi notation, respectively:

  (see termial)
  (see factorial)

Normally dots should be used only where the pattern to be followed is clear, the exception being to show the indefinite continuation of an irrational number such as:

 

Sometimes, it is useful to display a formula compactly, for example:

 

Another example is the set of positive zeros of the cosine function:

 

There are many related uses of the ellipsis in set notation.

The diagonal and vertical forms of the ellipsis are particularly useful for showing missing terms in matrices, such as the size-n identity matrix:

Computer science

Programming languages

A two- or three-dot ellipsis is used as an operator in some programming languages. One of its most common uses is in defining ranges or sequences, for instance  means all the numbers from 1 through 10. This is used in many languages, including Pascal, Modula, Oberon, Ada, Haskell, Perl, Ruby, Rust, Swift, Kotlin, Bash shell and F#. It is also used to indicate variadic functions in the C, C++ and Java languages.

HTML and CSS
The CSS text-overflow property can be set to ellipsis, which cuts off text with an ellipsis when it overflows the content area.

On Internet chat rooms and in text messaging
The ellipsis is a non-verbal cue that is often used in computer-mediated interactions, in particular in synchronous genres, such as chat. The reason behind its popularity is the fact that it allows people to indicate in writing several functions:
 The sign of ellipsis can function as a floor holding device, and signal that more is to come, for instance when people break up longer turns in chat.
 Dot-dot-dot can be used systematically to enact linguistic politeness, for instance indicating topic change or hesitation.
 Suspension dots can be turn construction units to signal silence, for example when indicating disagreement, disapproval or confusion.

Although an ellipsis is technically complete with three periods (...), its rise in popularity as a "trailing-off" or "silence" indicator, particularly in mid-20th-century comic strip and comic book prose writing, has led to expanded uses online. Today, extended ellipses anywhere from two to dozens of periods have become common constructions in Internet chat rooms and text messages. The extent of repetition in itself might serve as an additional contextualization or paralinguistic cue; one paper wrote that they "extend the lexical meaning of the words, add character to the sentences, and allow fine-tuning and personalisation of the message".

In some text messaging software products, an ellipsis is displayed while the interlocutor is typing characters. The feature has been referred to as a typing awareness indicator.

Computer representations
In computing, several ellipsis characters have been codified, depending on the system used.

In the Unicode standard, there are the following characters:

Unicode recognizes a series of three period characters (U+002E) as compatibility equivalent (though not canonical) to the horizontal ellipsis character.

In HTML, the horizontal ellipsis character may be represented by the entity reference &hellip; (since HTML 4.0), and the vertical ellipsis character by the entity reference &vellip; (since HTML 5.0). Alternatively, in HTML, XML, and SGML, a numeric character reference such as &#x2026; or &#8230; can be used.

In the TeX typesetting system, the following types of ellipsis are available:

In LaTeX, note that the reverse orientation of \ddots can be achieved with \reflectbox provided by the graphicx package: \reflectbox{\ddots} yields .

With the amsmath package from AMS-LaTeX, more specific ellipses are provided for math mode.

The horizontal ellipsis character also appears in the following older character maps:
 in Windows-1250—Windows-1258 and in IBM/MS-DOS Code page 874, at code 85 (hexadecimal)
 in Mac-Roman, Mac-CentEuro and several other Macintosh encodings, at code C9 (hexadecimal)
 in Ventura International encoding at code C1 (hexadecimal)

Note that ISO/IEC 8859 encoding series provides no code point for ellipsis.

As with all characters, especially those outside the ASCII range, the author, sender and receiver of an encoded ellipsis must be in agreement upon what bytes are being used to represent the character. Naive text processing software may improperly assume that a particular encoding is being used, resulting in mojibake.

Input

In Android, ellipsis is a long-press key. If Gboard is in alphanumeric layout, change to numeric and special characters layout by pressing  from alphanumeric layout. Once in numeric and special characters layout, long press  key to insert an ellipsis. This is a single symbol without spaces in between the three dots.

In Chinese and sometimes in Japanese, ellipsis characters are made by entering two consecutive horizontal ellipses, each with Unicode code point U+2026. In vertical texts, the application should rotate the symbol accordingly.

See also
 
 
 Code folding or holophrasting -- switching between full text and an ellipsis
 
  – a row of three dots (usually widely separated) alone in the middle of a gap between two paragraphs, to indicate a sub-chapter.
 An em dash  is sometimes used instead of an ellipsis, especially in written dialogue.
 . In written text, this is sometimes denoted using the horizontal ellipsis.

References

Further reading

 
 Halliday, M. A. K., and Ruqayia, H. (1976), Cohesion in English, London: Longman.

External links 
 
 

Mathematical notation
Punctuation
Typographical symbols